Barsness may refer to:

People
Edward E. Barsness (1891-1982), American newspaper editor and politician
Nellie Barsness (1873-1966), American physician and temperance worker

Places

United States
Barsness Lake, a lake in Douglas County, Minnesota
Barsness Township, Pope County, Minnesota